These are the rosters of the ten participating teams at the inaugural Mundialito de Clubes (or Club World Cup) beach soccer tournament that will take place at a temporary beach soccer stadium at Represa de Guarapiranga, a reservoir located in São Paulo, Brazil from 19–26 March 2011. The first nine were drafted at the Official Draft, with the tenth player added by Beach Soccer Worldwide 48 hours later.

Rosters of Participating Teams

Barcelona

Boca Juniors

Corinthians

Flamengo

Lokomotiv Moscow

Milan

Santos

Seattle Sounders

Sporting CP

Vasco da Gama

See also
Beach soccer
Beach Soccer Worldwide

References

 Beach Soccer Brasil (Portuguese)
 Mundialito de Clubes Beach Soccer (Portuguese)

External links
Beach Soccer Worldwide

Mundialito de Clubes
2011 in beach soccer